Imri Demelezi (born 1985) is a Kosovar Albanian agroeconomist and current deputy minister of agriculture, forestry and rural development of the Republic of Kosovo.

He completed his undergraduate studies in agroeconomics at the University of Prishtina and obtained a master's degree in sustainable agricultural and rural development from the University of Bologna in Italy. He also completed a specialization in agriculture at CIHEAM, IAMB, in Bari, Italy.

He formerly worked as a teaching assistant at the University of Prishtina, and lectured at UBT College prior to his current position.

Demelezi was a candidate in the 2019 parliamentary election with Vetëvendosje. He served as deputy minister of agriculture in the first Kurti government during its brief tenure in 2020. He returned to government with the second Kurti cabinet in March 2021.

References

Living people
1985 births
University of Pristina alumni
University of Bologna alumni